Frank Peak Akers (March 28, 1901 – March 22, 1988) was an American naval rear admiral who was the first aviator to make an instrument landing aboard an aircraft carrier.

Military career
On 11 September 1925, he earned his naval "Wings of Gold" and became an aviator. He later earned a master's degree in electronic communications from Harvard University in 1933. After graduation, he became a flight test officer at the Naval Air Station in San Diego, California. What made this hazardous was that he was fitted with a special hood preventing visual contact with the outside world. He earned the Distinguished Flying Cross for being the first to land a plane on a carrier deck without sight.

Later in the war, while stationed in Washington as head of the Radio and Electrical Branch of the Bureau of  Aeronautics, he received the Legion of Merit for his part in developing more efficient and simplified aircraft electronic systems, including radar bombing.

He is also the only aviator ever to have been assigned as Assistant Chief of Naval Operations for Undersea Warfare, from 1951 to 1954. On 11 January 1962, he received the Gray Eagle Award honoring him as the Naval Aviator who had been flying longer than any other on active duty, which he held until his retirement on 1 April 1963.

References

External links

 
  Commanding officers of the USS Saratoga (CV-3)
 Navy's First Blind Flight 

United States Naval Academy alumni
United States Navy pilots of World War II
United States Navy rear admirals (upper half)
Harvard University alumni
Recipients of the Distinguished Flying Cross (United States)
Recipients of the Legion of Merit
1901 births
1988 deaths